The Tarn (possibly meaning 'rapid' or 'walled in') is a  long river in the administrative region of Occitania in southern France. It is a right tributary of the Garonne.

The Millau Viaduct spans the valley of the Tarn near Millau, and is now one of the area's most popular attractions.

Main tributaries
The tributaries of the Tarn include:
 Agout (in Saint-Sulpice)
 Alrance
 Aveyron (near Montauban)
 Cernon
 Dourbie (in Millau)
 Dourdou de Camarès
 Jonte (in Le Rozier)
 Lemboulas
 Lumensonesque
 Muze
 Rance (near Trébas)
 Tarnon (in Florac)
 Tescou

The Tarn separates the Narbonne and Aquitaine basins.

Departments and cities

The Tarn passes through the following departments and towns:
Lozère: Le Pont-de-Montvert, Sainte-Enimie
Aveyron: Millau
Tarn: Albi, Gaillac, Lisle-sur-Tarn, Rabastens
Haute-Garonne: Villemur-sur-Tarn
Tarn-et-Garonne: Montauban, Moissac.

The Millau Viaduct, the tallest bridge in the world, carrying the A75 autoroute across the Tarn Gorge near Millau, opened in December 2004.

The Tarn is famous for its brutal floods, which are the most dangerous in Europe along with the Danube. One third of the Tarn-et-Garonne department was flooded, about 300 people died, thousands of houses were destroyed, the low-lying districts of Montauban were destroyed, and the town of Moissac was almost entirely destroyed.

Navigation

The Tarn was once navigable from its junction with the Garonne to Corbarieu, near Montauban. The canal was linked to the Canal de Garonne in Moissac by a branch lock upstream of the first river lock, and again, via the Canal de Montech, at Montauban.

The two access points from the Canal de Garonne have both been restored, and boats can again access the immediate reaches of the river at these points. Additionally the first river lock, between Moissac and the Garonne itself, has been flooded by the barrage for the Golfech power station on the Garonne, and is permanently open to boats which can thus reach the Garonne and navigate a short distance of that river.

The remaining six river locks are disused and unnavigable. A proposal exists to restore the five river locks between Moissac and Montauban, thus creating a waterway ring consisting of the Tarn from Moissac to Montauban, the Canal de Montech to Montech and the Canal de Garonne back to Moissac.

See also
Gorges du Tarn
Tourism in Tarn

References

External links

French Waterways - River Tarn Navigation guide to the lower 
http://www.gorgesdutarn.net/?lang=en

Rivers of France
Rivers of Occitania (administrative region)
Rivers of Lozère
Rivers of Aveyron
Rivers of Tarn (department)
Rivers of Haute-Garonne
Rivers of Tarn-et-Garonne